Frontier Agent is a 1948 American Western film directed by Lambert Hillyer and written by J. Benton Cheney. The film stars Johnny Mack Brown, Raymond Hatton, Reno Browne, Kenneth MacDonald, Dennis Moore and Riley Hill. The film was released on May 16, 1948 by Monogram Pictures.

Plot

Cast          
Johnny Mack Brown as Johnny Mack Brown
Raymond Hatton as Cappy
Reno Browne as Sandra Kerrigan 
Kenneth MacDonald as Burton Wheelock
Dennis Moore as Larry Foster
Riley Hill as Joe Farr
Frank LaRue as Dell Carson
Ted Adams as Jim Kerrigan
Virginia Carroll as Paula 
William Ruhl as Carson
Kansas Moehring as Nevada 
Bill Hale as Eddie

References

External links
 

1948 films
American Western (genre) films
1948 Western (genre) films
Monogram Pictures films
Films directed by Lambert Hillyer
American black-and-white films
1940s English-language films
1940s American films